The 1970–71 Vehicle & General Australasian knock-out competition was the second edition of the official List A domestic tournament in Australia. Seven teams representing six states in Australia and New Zealand took part in the knock-out competition. The competition began on 18 October 1970 when South Australia took on Victoria at the Adelaide Oval.

The 1970–71 cup final was played on 6 February 1971 at the Melbourne Cricket Ground between Queensland and Western Australia, with Western Australia recording an 91 run victory over Queensland. Ian Chappell scored the most runs in the tournament with 176 runs with Graham McKenzie from Western Australia taking the most wickets with eight.

Format
The second season of the competition was a straight knockout competition between the six states of Australia and a team that represented New Zealand at the domestic level.

Fixtures

First round

Semi-finals

Final

See also
1970-71 Sheffield Shield season

External links
 Cricket Australia
 Baggygreen

1970–71 Australian cricket season
1971 in New Zealand cricket
1970
Domestic cricket competitions in 1970–71